Stacie Chan (born December 19, 1984) is an American actress and journalist, best known for her role as Jade Chan in the animated series Jackie Chan Adventures. Chan currently works for Google News as a community manager. She formerly worked for Patch.com, as a news editor.

Early life and education
Chan is of Chinese ancestry and attended Arcadia High School, located in Arcadia, California. She attended Stanford University, where in 2010 she attained her Bachelor of Arts degree in communications and a minor in Spanish. And in 2010 she completed the graduate program in journalism.

Career
Chan voiced the character of Jade, Jackie Chan's fictional niece, in Jackie Chan Adventures throughout the show's 95-episode run. She started at the age of 11, continuing until her sophomore year in high school.

In addition to the Jackie Chan Adventures, Chan was a guest star in Drake & Josh. Stacie Chan plays Marta, asking Josh if he can see Jupiter with her Virtual Reality Helmet. Additional live action work includes guest roles in Mr. Show with Bob and David and Charmed; additional voice-over guest roles include What's New, Scooby-Doo? and Fillmore!.

In 2001, she was nominated for an Emmy Award for “Outstanding Performance in a Voiceover Lead” for her character on Jackie Chan Adventures.

Filmography

References

External links 
 
 
 Redwood City profile

1984 births
Living people
American child actresses
American film actresses
American journalists of Chinese descent
American television actresses
American twins
American video game actresses
American voice actresses
American women journalists of Asian descent
Place of birth missing (living people)
Stanford University alumni
20th-century American actresses
21st-century American actresses